The following are the records of North Korea in Olympic weightlifting. Records are maintained in each weight class for the snatch lift, clean and jerk lift, and the total for both lifts by the Weightlifting Association of the Democratic People's Republic of Korea.

Current records

Men

Women

Historical records

Men (1998–2018)

Women (1998–2018)

References

records
North Korea
Olympic weightlifting
weightlifting